Hanceville is a city in Cullman County, Alabama, United States. At the 2020 census, the population was 3,217.

History

Founded in Blount County, Hanceville was established in 1832 and incorporated in May 1879. At the time of Cullman County's creation in 1877, half of Hanceville resided in each county. In 1885, county boundaries were redrawn and all of Hanceville was placed within Blount County. In 1901, county boundaries were redrawn again and this time all of the town was placed within Cullman County, in which it has remained.

Geography
Hanceville is located in southeastern Cullman County at  (34.063463, -86.760908). U.S. Route 31 passes through the city, leading north  to Cullman, the county seat, and south  to Smoke Rise.

Climate

Demographics

At the 2000 census there were 2,951 people, 1,167 households, and 710 families living in the city. The racial makeup of the city was 93.09% White, 4.61% Black or African American, 0.61% Native American, 0.07% Asian, 0.03% Pacific Islander, 0.75% from other races, and 0.85% from two or more races. 2.30% of the population were Hispanic or Latino of any race.
Of the 1,167 households 24.0% had children under the age of 18 living with them, 45.8% were married couples living together, 11.5% had a female householder with no husband present, and 39.1% were non-families. 32.6% of households were one person and 12.1% were one person aged 65 or older. The average household size was 2.23 and the average family size was 2.84.

The age distribution was 17.8% under the age of 18, 17.7% from 18 to 24, 22.0% from 25 to 44, 21.2% from 45 to 64, and 21.3% 65 or older. The median age was 38 years. For every 100 females, there were 87.5 males. For every 100 females age 18 and over, there were 80.8 males.

The median household income was $26,351 and the median family income  was $35,370. Males had a median income of $31,439 versus $18,112 for females. The per capita income for the city was $13,371. About 12.5% of families and 21.9% of the population were below the poverty line, including 28.9% of those under age 18 and 13.5% of those age 65 or over.

2010 census

At the 2010 census there were 2,982 people, 1,233 households, and 691 families living in the city. The racial makeup of the city was 92.4% White, 3.6% Black or African American, 0.2% Native American, 0.7% Asian, 0.0% Pacific Islander, 1.4% from other races, and 1.6% from two or more races. 2.4% of the population were Hispanic or Latino of any race.
Of the 1,233 households 23.3% had children under the age of 18 living with them, 38.1% were married couples living together, 13.6% had a female householder with no husband present, and 44.0% were non-families. 37.1% of households were one person and 17.0% were one person aged 65 or older. The average household size was 2.26 and the average family size was 2.98.

The age distribution was 21.6% under the age of 18, 10.9% from 18 to 24, 22.5% from 25 to 44, 22.1% from 45 to 64, and 22.8% 65 or older. The median age was 40.0 years. For every 100 females, there were 83.1 males. For every 100 females age 18 and over, there were 95.2 males.

The median household income was $30,903 and the median family income  was $45,560. Males had a median income of $34,338 versus $35,417 for females. The per capita income for the city was $16,078. About 14.5% of families and 24.2% of the population were below the poverty line, including 28.1% of those under age 18 and 9.8% of those age 65 or over.

2020 census

As of the 2020 United States census, there were 3,217 people, 1,263 households, and 730 families residing in the city. Of the 1,233 households 23.3% had children under the age of 18 living with them, 38.1% were married couples living together, 13.6% had a female householder with no husband present, and 44.0% were non-families. 37.1% of households were one person and 17.0% were one person aged 65 or older. The average household size was 2.26 and the average family size was 2.98.

The age distribution was 21.6% under the age of 18, 10.9% from 18 to 24, 22.5% from 25 to 44, 22.1% from 45 to 64, and 22.8% 65 or older. The median age was 47.7 years. For every 100 females, there were 83.1 males. For every 100 females age 18 and over, there were 95.2 males.

The average household income in Hanceville is $49,660 with a poverty rate of 19.00%. The median rental costs in recent years comes to $668 per month, and the median house value is $99,900. The median age in Hanceville is 47.7 years, 41.8 years for males, and 49.9 years for females.

Attractions
Hanceville is home to Our Lady of the Angels Monastery. The construction began in 1996 and was completed in 1999, under the direction of Mother Angelica of the Eternal Word Television Network (EWTN).

Hanceville is also home to Alabama's oldest paintball and airsoft field, Mount Doom Paintball Field. It has been in operation since the 1980s.

Education
Hanceville High School serves 342 students in grades 9–12. The school colors are purple and gold, and its mascot are the Bulldogs. It is a member of the Cullman County Board of Education. In 2001 the Lady Bulldogs basketball team won the Alabama High School Athletic Association Class 3A State Championship.

Colleges and universities
Wallace State Community College is the only college in the city. It opened in 1966 and has approximately 6,000 students.

Laws
Hanceville, Alabama gained some media coverage when they passed a law that prevents transgendered people from using the restroom of their choice.

Notable people
 Mother Angelica, founder of the Eternal Word Television Network (EWTN), formerly cloistered in the Shrine of the Most Blessed Sacrament
 Allen Green, former NFL player
 Craig Kimbrel, closer for the Boston Red Sox went to community college in Hanceville at Wallace State Community College.
Country music artist Kip Moore attended Wallace State Community College in Hanceville.
 Candi Staton, soul and gospel singer
 Bill Steltemeier, founding president of EWTN

References

External links
City of Hanceville official website
The Hanceville News 

Cities in Alabama
Cities in Cullman County, Alabama
1879 establishments in Alabama